Bevolo Gas and Electric Lights is the oldest and largest manufacturer of handmade, hand-riveted copper lanterns in the United States.

Bevolo was founded by Andrew Bevolo, Sr. in 1945 and remains a family business, currently operated by Andrew Bevolo, III. Andrew Bevolo, Sr. founded the company with experience working for Ford, Igor Sikorsky and Andrew Higgins. The company revolutionized gas lighting by utilizing hand-riveting, which is a technique superior to soldering that guarantees the lantern's continuous pristine condition. As a result, their lights are featured prominently in the New Orleans French Quarter and on the mansions in the historic Garden District.

History
In the 20th century, A. Hays Town worked with Andrew Bevolo, Sr. to produce the trademark French Quarter Lamp. After Hurricane Katrina, Bevolo opened a manufacturing location in Covington, Louisiana, and a retail location in Mandeville. In 2009, Bevolo opened another retail location on the famous Royal Street in the French Quarter. In addition to showcasing the historic gas and electric lanterns, the retail locations sell antiques and other products manufactured by the company, including interior lighting and furniture.

The company caters to high income customers and has a wide variety of restaurant, commercial, residential clients. Bevolo products appear frequently on television and in movies.

Product
All Bevolo gas and electric lights are manufactured in the New Orleans area and all are fabricated by hand using antiqued copper. Bevolo offers complementary design services in order to ensure lighting is the correct size and architecturally appropriate. The company has over 500 variations of light and bracket combinations and offers custom made lighting. Bevolo lighting is ETL (Edison Testing Laboratories) approved.

References

External links
Bevolo Gas and Electric Lights
FrenchQuarter.com: One-of-a-Kind, Bevolo Gas & Electric

Manufacturing companies based in New Orleans
French Quarter
Lighting brands
Industrial design firms